The 2017 Coates Hire Newcastle 500 was a motor racing event for the Supercars Championship, held on the weekend of 24 to 26 November 2017. The event was held on the Newcastle Street Circuit in Newcastle East, New South Wales and consisted of two races, 250 kilometres in length. It was the fourteenth and final event in the 2017 Supercars Championship and hosted Races 25 and 26 of the season.

The event was the first running of the Newcastle 500, following the discontinuation of the Sydney 500 at the conclusion of the 2016 season.

Background
Five drivers came into the final event of the series with a mathematical chance of securing the title, the highest number since 2005.

Jamie Whincup leads the championship on 2850 points, 30 points ahead of Scott McLaughlin. McLaughlin's team-mate Fabian Coulthard sits third, 176 points behind Whincup. Chaz Mostert and Shane van Gisbergen are the other two drivers with a chance, however they are 264 and 276 points behind respectively.

Taz Douglas replaced Jack Perkins at Lucas Dumbrell Motorsport.

Report

Practice

Race 25

Qualifying

Race 

 Shane van Gisbergen received a 15 second penalty for a driving infringement.

Race 26

Qualifying

Top 10 Shootout

Race 

 Scott McLaughlin received a 25 second penalty for a driving infringement.

Standings after the event

Drivers Championship

Teams Championship

 Note: Only the top five positions are included for both sets of standings.

References

Newcastle 500
Newcastle 500
Newcastle 500